Whispers was one of the new horror and fantasy fiction magazines of the 1970s.

History
Named after a fictitious magazine referenced in the H. P. Lovecraft story "The Unnamable", Whispers began as an attempt by editor and publisher Stuart David Schiff to produce a modest semi-professional little magazine that hoped to revive the legendary Weird Tales in a small way. The magazine was also a followup to August Derleth's The Arkham Collector, which had ceased after Derleth's death. Whispers  was first published in July 1973. It went on to become a more elaborate showcase for dark fantasy fiction and artwork of the 1970s. Schiff's early influences included the story of Aladdin, the Gorgon and the Cyclops, Edgar Allan Poe, Weird Tales and Lee Brown Coye. He subsequently became an avid collector of horror books and materials.

Among the fiction writers featured in the magazine were Manly Wade Wellman, Fritz Leiber, Robert Bloch, Ramsey Campbell, and Karl Edward Wagner. David Drake published much of his early fantasy fiction there. Among the artists to contribute were Stephen Fabian, Lee Brown Coye, Vincent Napoli, and many others, both legends in their own right and younger stars.  The magazine won the first "Howard" or World Fantasy Award for non-professional publishing in 1975, though it was clearly on a professional level in editorial content and production. When Schiff and his wife had their first child, Geoffrey Ashton Schiff, Schiff brought out a special edition of Whispers devoted to the theme of monstrous and ghastly babies. It ended publication in October 1987 with the issues 23 and 24.

Beginning in 1978, an anthology series, drawing on work published in the magazine and mixing some new material, was published in hardcover by Doubleday and then in paperback by Playboy Press, soon after absorbed by Berkley/Putnam, which began a trend of parallel publication of increasingly infrequent issues of the magazine and a string of anthologies with an ever-larger proportion of original fiction.  A total of six anthologies were published through 1987, and later a "Best of" volume was published in 1994.

Whispers Press

Schiff also launched a book-publishing arm, Whispers Press, in the latter 1970s, which produced illustrated volumes. The first Whispers Press volume was A Winter Wish, a volume of uncollected poetry by H.P. Lovecraft, edited by Tom Collins. Collins' edition was roundly criticised by S.T. Joshi for its being riddled with typographical errors.  Shortly thereafter, Whispers Press issued the short novel Rime Isle by Fritz Leiber. Several other publications were issued, most in both trade and signed/numbered/slipcased editions (including Robert Bloch's Cthulhu Mythos novel Strange Eons), all showing an appreciation of fine bookmaking and quality workmanship. After a sampling from Whispers was published in the Gahan Wilson-edited First World Fantasy Awards volume, Schiff and Fritz Leiber co-edited the Second World Fantasy Awards volume for Doubleday.

See also
 Science fiction magazine
 Fantasy fiction magazine
 Horror fiction magazine

References

External links

Speculative fiction magazines published in the United States
Defunct magazines published in the United States
Fantasy fiction magazines
Horror fiction magazines
Magazines established in 1973
Magazines disestablished in 1987
Playboy Press books